The 2019–20 ABA League First Division was the 19th season of the ABA League with 12 teams from Bosnia and Herzegovina, Croatia, Montenegro,  Slovenia and Serbia participating in it. The season started on 4 October 2019 and played its last games on 9 March 2020 due to the COVID-19 pandemic. 

On 12 March 2020, the ABA League Assembly temporarily suspended its competitions due to the COVID-19 pandemic. On 27 May 2020, the ABA League Assembly canceled definitely its competitions due to the COVID-19 pandemic.

Crvena zvezda mts was the defending champion and as a consequence of the COVID-19 pandemic, the ABA League Assembly decided not to recognize any team as the champion for the season.

Teams

Promotion and relegation
A total of 12 teams will contest the league, including 11 sides from the 2018–19 season and one promoted from the 2018–19 Second Division.

Team promoted from the Second Division
 Koper Primorska

Team relegated to the Second Division
 Petrol Olimpija

Venues and locations

Personnel and sponsorship

Coaching changes

Regular season
The regular season starts in September 2019 and ends in March 2020.

League table

Positions by round

Results

Statistical leaders

| width=50% valign=top |

Points

 

|}

|}

| width=50% valign=top |

Assists

 

|}

|}Source: ABA League

MVP List

MVP of the Round

Source: ABA League

MVP of the Month

Clubs in European competitions

See also 
 List of current ABA League First Division team rosters
 2019–20 ABA League Second Division
 2019 ABA League Supercup
 2019–20 Junior ABA League
 2019–20 WABA League

2019–20 domestic competitions
  2019–20 Basketball League of Serbia
  2019–20 HT Premijer liga
  2019–20 Slovenian Basketball League
  2019–20 Prva A liga
  2019–20 Basketball Championship of Bosnia and Herzegovina

Teams
 2019–20 KK Cedevita Olimpija season
 2019–20 KK Crvena zvezda season
 2019–20 KK Partizan season

Notes

References

External links 
 Official website
 ABA League at Eurobasket.com

 
2019-20

2019–20 in European basketball leagues
2019–20 in Serbian basketball
2019–20 in Slovenian basketball
2019–20 in Croatian basketball
2019–20 in Bosnia and Herzegovina basketball
2019–20 in Montenegrin basketball
Basketball events curtailed and voided due to the COVID-19 pandemic